The LOS40 Music Awards 2017 were the twelfth edition of the LOS40 Music Awards, the annual awards organized by Spanish radio station Los 40. It was held on November 10, 2017 in the WiZink Center in Madrid, Spain.

Performances

Awards and nominations
The nominations were revealed on September 14, 2017.

Artist of the Year
 David Bisbal
 Dani Martín
 Leiva
 Vanesa Martín
 Manuel Carrasco

New Artist of the Year
 Bombai
 Blas Cantó
 Taburete
 C. Tangana
 Bromas Aparte

Album of the Year
 David Bisbal - Hijos del mar
 Vanesa Martín - Munay
 David Otero - David Otero
 Joaquín Sabina - Lo niego todo
 Taburete - Dr. Charas

Song of the Year
 Bombai feat. Bebe - Solo si es contigo
 Leiva - La lluvia en los zapatos
 Álvaro Soler & Morat - Yo contigo, tú conmigo
 Vanesa Martín - Complicidad
 David Bisbal - Antes que no

Video of the Year
 David Bisbal - Antes que no
 Leiva - La lluvia en los zapatos
 C. Tangana - Mala mujer
 Blas Cantó - In Your Bed
 Various artists - Y, ¿si fuera ella?

International Artist of the Year
 Ed Sheeran
 Shawn Mendes
 Kygo
 Bruno Mars
 Charlie Puth

International New Artist of the Year
 Rag'n'Bone Man
 Kaleo
 Julia Michaels
 Harry Styles
 Bebe Rexha

International Album of the Year
 Ed Sheeran - ÷
 Harry Styles - Harry Styles
 Calvin Harris - Funk Wav Bounces Vol. 1
 Bruno Mars - 24K Magic
 Imagine Dragons - Evolve

International Song of the Year
 Ed Sheeran - Shape of You
 Luis Fonsi & Daddy Yankee feat. Justin Bieber - Despacito
 Clean Bandit feat. Sean Paul & Anne-Marie - Rockabye
 Rag'n'Bone Man - Human
 The Chainsmokers & Coldplay - Something Just Like This

International Video of the Year
 Katy Perry feat. Skip Marley - Chained to the Rhythm
 Ed Sheeran - Shape of You
 Kygo & Selena Gomez - It Ain't Me
 Luis Fonsi feat. Daddy Yankee - Despacito
 Bruno Mars - That's What I Like

Best Latin Artist
 J Balvin
 Shakira
 Maluma
 Luis Fonsi
 Juanes

Tour of the Year
 Bruno Mars - 24K Magic World Tour
 Ed Sheeran - ÷ Tour
 Leiva - Gira Monstruos
 U2 - The Joshua Tree Tour 2017
 Maluma - Pretty Boy Dirty Boy World Tour

Lo + 40 Artist Award
 Ariana Grande
 Charlie Puth
 Harry Styles
 Camila Cabello
 Shawn Mendes

LOS40 Trending Artist Award
 L.A.
 Arcade Fire
 Rayden
 Monarchy
 The xx

Golden Music Awards
 U2
 Alejandro Sanz
 Luis Fonsi & Daddy Yankee feat. Justin Bieber - Despacito

LOS40 Global Show Award
 Luis Fonsi feat. Daddy Yankee - Despacito
 Maluma - Felices los 4
 Shakira - Me enamoré
 J Balvin & Willy William - Mi gente
 Enrique Iglesias feat. Descemer Bueno & Zion & Lennox - Súbeme la radio

LOS40 Blackjack Artist Award
 Sofi Tukker
 Royal Blood
 Haim
 Portugal. The Man
 Bleachers

References

Los Premios 40 Principales
2017 music awards